In 1952, Billboard magazine published National Best Sellers and Most Played in Juke Boxes, two charts covering the top-performing songs in the United States in rhythm and blues and related African-American-oriented music genres. These charts, published as Best Selling Retail Rhythm & Blues Records and Most Played Juke Box Rhythm & Blues Records through the issue dated November 8, were based on sales in stores and plays in jukeboxes, respectively.  They are considered part of the lineage of the magazine's multimetric R&B chart launched in 1958, which since 2005 has been published under the title Hot R&B/Hip-Hop Songs.

In the issue of Billboard dated January 5, the Clovers were at number one on the juke box chart with "Fool, Fool, Fool" and Earl Bostic and his Orchestra were atop the best sellers listing with "Flamingo", both tracks retaining the position from the last issue of 1951.  The following week both songs were displaced from number one, as the Griffin Brothers Orchestra moved into the top spot on the juke box chart with "Weepin' & Cryin'" and "Cry" by Johnnie Ray and the Four Lads reached number one on the best sellers listing.  Both songs were the only R&B chart-topper achieved by their respective performers.  The year's longest unbroken run at number one on the juke box chart was seven weeks, achieved by Jimmy Forrest in March and April with "Night Train", but the longest-running chart-topper overall was "Juke" by Little Walter, which spent eight non-consecutive weeks in the top spot.  On the best sellers listing, two songs each spent seven consecutive weeks in the top spot: "5–10–15 Hours" by Ruth Brown and "My Song" by Johnny Ace.  The latter song spent nine weeks at number one in total, making it the longest-running number one of the year on that chart.  Despite its sales success, Ace's song failed to top the juke box chart, peaking at number 2.

In June, Fats Domino gained his first number one when he topped the best sellers list for a single week with "Goin' Home".  Domino was the most successful black rock & roll artist of the 1950s and achieved a string of pop and R&B successes until the mid-1960s.  In recognition of this, he was included in the inaugural class of inductees to the Rock and Roll Hall of Fame in 1986.  Domino also played on the song "Lawdy Miss Clawdy", which gave another future Rock and Roll Hall of Famer, Lloyd Price, his first number one in July.  The song is considered to have been a significant early influence on the emerging rock and roll genre and was covered by Elvis Presley in 1956.  The year's final number one on the juke box chart was "Five Long Years" by Eddie Boyd and the last chart-topper on the best sellers listing was "I Don't Know" by Willie Mabon and his Combo.  In both cases it was the artist's first charting song.

Chart history

a.  Two songs tied for number one on the best sellers chart in this issue.

References

Works cited

1952
1952 record charts
1952 in American music